KKBA is an active rock formatted broadcast radio station licensed to Kingsville, Texas, serving Corpus Christi, Alice, and Kingsville in Texas.  KKBA is locally owned and operated by Malkan Interactive Communications.

History
On September 4, 2015, KKBA switched from a Rhythmic Adult Contemporary format to Active Rock as "Rock 92-7".  Malkan added the San Antonio-based "Billy Madison Show" to mornings.

References

External links
Rock 92.7 Facebook
Rock 92-7 Online

1981 establishments in Texas
Active rock radio stations in the United States
Radio stations established in 1981
KBA
KBA